Virodhi may refer to:

 Virodhi (1992 film), a 1992 Indian Bollywood film produced and directed by Rajkumar Kohli
 Virodhi (2011 film), a 2011 Telugu film directed by G. Neelakanta Reddy